Ukraine's Strongest Man is an annual strongman competition held in Ukraine and featuring exclusively Ukrainian athletes. Vasyl Virastyuk holds the record for most wins with 7 wins.

Top 3 placings

External links 
Official site

National strongmen competitions